Album of the Year is the sixth studio album by American rock band Faith No More, released on June 3, 1997, by Slash and Reprise Records. It is the first album to feature the band's current guitarist Jon Hudson, and was their last studio album before their eleven-year hiatus from 1998 to 2009. The album has been described by AllMusic as being "more straightforward musically than past releases." It spawned three singles: "Ashes to Ashes", "Last Cup of Sorrow", and "Stripsearch".

Background

Recording
Album of the Year guitarist Jon Hudson joined the band in 1996, after the departure of Dean Menta. Regarding Menta, Billy Gould said, "We didn't fire Dean because he was an asshole, we didn't fire Dean because of anything, it was just because we couldn't write. And he had already written songs but it wasn't working. He toured fine."

In a 1997 interview with SFGate, Gould reflected on the making of the album, saying, "Very rarely were we all in the same city at the same time. If we were lucky, there'd be a three-week window, and then we'd practice as much as we could and record at the end of the period." Roddy Bottum similarly recalled that "everybody's schedule was hectic. And so it was a situation of making the record around people's other projects."

When early demo work on Album of the Year was beginning between Mike Bordin, Bottum, Gould and Menta, Mike Patton was still performing with Mr. Bungle, who were in the midst of their Disco Volante run of shows. Bottum stated in a June 1997 interview with Australian paper The Herald Sun that "We decided we'd just write a bunch of songs and keep the songwriting as simple as possible and just go into the studio and record as quickly as possible. That was the way we used to write stuff when we started the band, just really simple repetitive riffs without a whole lot of thought. And Mike came back from his tour with Mr. Bungle, and he only liked about half of the songs, and only felt like he could sing on about half of the songs."

Following this round of demo work and the firing of Menta, the members pursued other projects, leaving the band on the verge of splitting (because of this, Album of the Year has since been labelled as a "miracle baby"). Gould said after Menta's firing "the momentum just shut down and everybody went off and started doing their side stuff." Bottum went out on tour to support the debut album of his Imperial Teen side project, Bordin left to tour with Black Sabbath for six months, and Mike Patton flew to Italy to be with his wife Cristina Zuccatosta, who he had married in 1994. Gould himself spent a few months travelling Europe. While in Albania, he came up with the song "Mouth to Mouth", which was inspired by the "loud arabic music" he heard on the streets there. Gould then returned to San Francisco to focus on the album with Hudson, who entered Faith No More during this period of inactivity between the collective group.

The early writing sessions with Hudson yielded 12 songs, including "Ashes to Ashes" and "Paths of Glory". Gould sent a tape of "Ashes to Ashes" to Patton in Italy, so he could add lyrics to it. Eight of these new songs written with Hudson were not included on the final album, due to being too "poppy".

During early 1997, all five members reconvened in San Francisco with Swiss producer Roli Mosimann, who is the long-standing collaborator of industrial rock band The Young Gods, a major influence on Faith No More. Bottum reflects "We did the record in parts, more than as a whole. Then at the end of the process, or near the end, we got together." Patton had written new songs while away in Italy with his wife, such as "Home Sick Home".

Mosimann encouraged the band to utilize computer-based recording/editing software Pro Tools, something they had not done before. Gould stated, "he said there were some things that he'd like to change in Pro Tools. A good example of Roli's editing was the song 'Mouth to Mouth.' It wasn't sounding right to us at all. It was almost a throwaway song. But Roli really liked that one, so he ended up taking the [acoustic] drums in the choruses and moving them to the verses in Pro Tools. It gave the song a whole new life."

Once recording was completed, the individual members spent time preparing for the upcoming tour in support of the album. The impending Album of the Year tour would end up sidetracking a covers album Mike Patton had planned on doing with Mr. Bungle.

The album's music displayed a more melancholic sound overall compared to previous releases. Gould said at the time, "it just turned out to be that way that the new material is more melodic, slower and more atmospheric. It was important for me that the album has a general mood that can be found in all songs and that it doesn't go in too many directions like we did in the past." Patton commented, "It's got more feelings and balance than our previous albums. Possibly it's darker too." Shortly before Album of the Year was released, San Francisco paper East Bay Times claimed it was "by and large, a heavy metal album."

Songs
"Naked in Front of the Computer" is one of the few songs in the Faith No More catalogue written solely by Mike Patton. In the early years of online filesharing, it was sometimes incorrectly labelled as an Incubus song. When asked about the song's meaning, Billy Gould replied: 
"She Loves Me Not" is the eighth song on the album. The song itself seems to draw its influence from lounge music. It was to be the fourth single off the album, but the band ended before this could be accomplished. It has also never been played live. Despite this, it made an appearance on Faith No More's 2006 greatest hits compilation The Platinum Collection. When asked about the song, Billy Gould replied: 

"Pristina" is a song written about the then ongoing conflicts in the Balkans (named after the capital of Kosovo), with it being the final track of the band's career for nearly two decades. Artistdirect state it "stands out as arguably the most beautiful song in Faith No More's catalog." The song was inspired by a trip Gould made to the Balkans, following a 1995 German tour with Faith No More. When interviewed by Serbian Times, he reminisced, "at that time no one in America knew what was happening there, American press didn't write about that [...] That place left a deep impression on me." A piano-based remix of the song by Gould appears on some editions of the album, along with several electronic-based remixes of other songs, made by people from outside the band. Gould said of the remix, "the reason I did it was because, well, I wrote the song, and at the time, the way remixers were going, there was a certain sameness [going on]; I didn’t want to just give [the track] to some remixer who was going to turn into like some kind of industrial house music song or something." He added that his remix took the song to "almost a smooth jazz level."

There are multiple references to cinema throughout Album of the Year. The track "Paths of Glory" is named after the 1957 film of the same name, while "Helpless" contains the line "I even tried to get arrested today", which is taken from the 1965 film The Slender Thread. "Helpless" also utilizes organ-like sounds in the verses. Despite this, no real organs were used on the song; the sounds were instead created via a patch on Bottum's Roland JV-1080 synthesizer. There are whistling effects towards the end of the song. When it was performed live for the first time in October 1997, the whistling was replaced by backing vocals.

The opening track "Collision" was ranked by Metal Hammer as the fifth heaviest Faith No More song. It features low, harsh synths that almost mimic a bass. Gould says, "a lot of the really cool sounds in this song that sound like guitar are actually keyboard string sounds running through a Tech 21 SansAmp. You can really mangle keyboard sounds with a SansAmp; you can get some amazing dark, ugly textures."

"The Big Kahuna" and "Light Up & Let Go" were originally intended to appear on the album, although they ended up appearing as B-sides and as bonus tracks for the Japanese edition. According to Mike Patton, "The Big Kahuna" was cut from the final track listing since it did not fit in with the rest of the album. He also claimed the song's title was not a reference to the Big Kahuna restaurant from Quentin Tarantino's Pulp Fiction.

The band recorded approximately two dozen songs during the Album of the Year sessions. However, almost no unreleased material from the sessions has ever surfaced. Patton said, "we did about 7 or 8 songs that won't appear on the album. I don't know if they will ever appear somewhere. It's like cookin' coffee...you have to throw it away when it's kinda bitter. The main problem all of the time was: are the songs good enough for the album or should we write some more. it's difficult to find the right balance. First we had too many commercial songs, then there were too many heavy songs." The only unreleased outtake to have emerged is the song "Instrumental", which appeared on the 1998 compilation Who Cares a Lot?. It has often been mislabelled as being from the 1994–95 King for a Day... Fool for a Lifetime era sessions, and was even included on the 2016 deluxe edition for that album.

Artwork and title

The photograph on the front cover depicts Czechoslovakia's first president, Tomáš Garrigue Masaryk, who is also regarded as the country's founding father.

The album jacket depicts the funeral of Masaryk, with the words "pravda vítězí" (truth prevails), the motto of the Czech Republic, adorning his coffin.

The artwork was reflected with the band frequently wearing suits during their tour in support of the album, a trend that carried over to their 2009 reunion tour.

While the album sleeve did not feature printed lyrics, Mike Patton and Billy Gould did submit official lyrics to fnm.com, which was a fan controlled site prior to the band's reformation in 2009.

Regarding the title Album of the Year, Bottum said in a June 14, 1997, interview with MTV Europe that "It just seemed right. We've been away for a while. Coming back with a bang or a scream seemed to be effective to us, and a little bit funny." In the same interview, Patton elaborated "I think if you can't see the humor in that, then you've got a problem."

Touring

As with previous albums, it was supported by a large scale tour that covered various countries, lasting from April 1997 to December 1997. During April 1998, the band reconvened for three festival dates in Spain and Portugal. These would end up being their last shows in over 10 years, as they announced their split later that month.

When the album was released in mid-1997, Mike Bordin was called in to perform with Ozzy Osbourne for that year's edition of Ozzfest, which ran from May 24 to July 1. This resulted in Robin Guy (of the band Rachel Stamp) filling in on drums for Bordin during a UK Top of the Pops performance on May 30, as well as an absence of any Faith No More shows during the month of June. Shortly after he returned from Ozzfest, the band had to cancel four July dates in Europe, so Bordin could attend the birth of his first daughter in San Francisco.

The Album of the Year tour is notable for featuring Limp Bizkit, a nu metal/rap metal band greatly influenced by Faith No More, as an opener for several 1997 US dates. They were frequently booed by Faith No More's fans, including during a September 1997 concert at the Electric Factory in Philadelphia, where the crowd booed them off stage. In a 2013 interview, Roddy Bottum reflected on the shows with Limp Bizkit, recalling "I fought it at the time. I had to really push to get a couple bands that I liked to get on the bill in Portland and Seattle on that leg. I had no interest in the sound of Limp Bizkit. It was not how I wanted to be represented at all. Not to be snotty at all, but that guy Fred Durst had a really bad attitude. He was kind of a jerk." Bottum also remembered an incident where Durst "called the audience faggots at one show when they booed him". Durst apologized to him after this show, as he did not know that Bottum had come out as gay in the early '90s. Limp Bizkit's guitarist Wes Borland later claimed that his band were excited about the prospect of getting to tour with Faith No More, stating "the idea of it was cool [but] once we got there, it was a really tough crowd. They have a really tough crowd to please, who are very vocal about not liking you. We opened for Faith No More and Primus in the same year, and the Primus tour went a lot better than the Faith No More tour." Borland added that he did not get to know Mike Patton personally until several years later.

During the Album of the Year tour, they would cover the Aqua song "Barbie Girl", "Ain't Talkin' 'bout Dub" by Apollo 440, "Highway Star" by Deep Purple, Will Smith's "Men in Black", Herb Alpert's "This Guy's in Love with You" and the R. Kelly songs "I Believe I Can Fly" and "Gotham City". An intro tape was used at the beginning of shows, which contained "Also sprach Zarathustra", followed by an Elvis-style fanfare clip announcing Faith No More as being from Caesars Palace, Las Vegas. The band's setlists for the tour mainly consisted of their 1990s material, with songs from Introduce Yourself and The Real Thing being played less frequently than before. However, the track "As the Worm Turns" (from 1985's We Care a Lot) began to appear more often this tour, having been mostly absent throughout the 1995 King for a Day... Fool for a Lifetime tour. All songs from Album of the Year were played during the tour, with the sole exception of "She Loves Me Not", which still remains one of the only studio album songs Faith No More has never performed live. The two b-sides "The Big Kahuna" and "Light Up & Let Go" were also not played, and have remained unperformed to this day. "Helpless" was only performed a single time on the tour, during the October 26, 1997, show at Festival Hall in Melbourne, Australia.

On the European legs, Faith No More performed in Croatia and Luxembourg, two countries they had never previously visited.

Reception

Initially Album of the Year was met with some lukewarm to negative responses from critics in North America, with the Rolling Stone magazine rating the album one-and-a-half stars out of five and commenting that the band "...are floundering around desperately, groping for a sense of identity and direction in a decade that clearly finds them irrelevant". Pitchfork gave the album a similarly negative review, stating, "Album Of The Year leaves one feeling like waking up and finding last night's used condom -- sure, the ride was fun while it lasted, but what remains is just plain icky. And you definitely don't want it in your CD player."

Canadian publication Fast Forward Weekly awarded it only one out of five stars in their issue for the week of June 12–June 18, 1997. The review states, "Sure, mixing metal pomp, punk attitude and white boy funk/rap may have seemed like a fresh idea at the time, but things have (thankfully) changed. It just doesn't seem like FNM's tired grind of big riffs and Patton's operatic yowling could have much impact on your average suburban spaz when groups like Rage Against the Machine, although equally annoying (and admittedly the direct progeny of FNM), at least deliver on the pre-teen adrenaline rush. Ultimately, Faith No More was simply one of those transitional bands that happened to be around when rock culture produced one of its generation shifts. Fine. Thank you for contributing. But, please go away now and bore no more." Joshua Sindell of Phoenix New Times wrote, "The usual intense concentration placed on the work has been leached away by side projects, such as Bottum's Imperial Teen and Patton's Mr. Bungle; even Bordin has spent most of the past couple of years touring with Ozzy Osbourne's band. Revealingly, AOTY clocks in at roughly a tidy 43 minutes, resulting in FNM's shortest CD in a decade." He concluded his review by proclaiming that Faith No More should "call it a day".

A less negative North American review came from MTV's Tom Phalen, he remarked that "This is a very listenable collection, and Faith No More deserves to be more than a one-hit wonder." His review also observed "[It's] clear that the success of new head-pounding youngsters like Korn and Rage Against the Machine hasn't been lost on FNM - 'Naked In Front of the Computer' angrily rails its fists against The Man and his devices."

The San Francisco Chronicle likewise had a positive take on the record, claiming "it has balance, poise, aggression and potential hits. Mike Patton's vocal work is outstanding, with genuine singing emerging from his more guttural bursts. Also, the welcome return of a more involved Bottum restores the full dimension of the band's sound." The review goes on to state, "Faith No More's trademarks appear subtly all over Album of the Year: the little melodic flutter during the opening spaces of 'Stripsearch', the dramatic keyboard platforms in the first single, 'Ashes to Ashes', and the cheesiness of the smooth, soulful 'She Loves Me Not'. The band also returns to the bitter aggression of some of its previous material [and] even manage a severely twisted late-night cocktail of a song, 'Home Sick Home'. After Album of the Year, it would be nothing short of criminal if the band decided to call it quits." British publication NME labelled it as a "slamdunk return to form" in a June 1997 issue. Shaun Carney of Australian paper The Age considered it an improvement over King for a Day... Fool for a Lifetime, writing, "Album of the Year is no great departure for this veteran San Francisco outfit, but it is more genuine than its ostentatious predecessor, King for a Day, and consequently more durable." Jerry Ewing of Vox magazine held a similar view. He wrote in June 1997, "the traits that propelled them to the forefront of the alternative metal scene in the early 90s, traits that were sadly lacking in 95's abrasive and unfriendly King for a Day... Fool for a Lifetime, have returned."

Accolades

Legacy
The album developed praise from the wider music community following the band's initial break-up in April 1998. In his retrospective review, Greg Prato of AllMusic gave the album a rating of four stars out of five and described it as being "a fitting way for one of alt-rock's most influential and important bands to end its career." The liner notes for the 2003 compilation This Is It: The Best of Faith No More assert: "If Angel Dust put an exclamation point on Faith No More's trademark sound, the release of their 1997 coda, Album of the Year, planted the ellipses at the end of a career that was as charismatic and riveting as it was jarring." Stereogum referred to it as "a great album" in 2015, and pointed out there was a deeper level of maturity. They wrote "Album of the Year sounds 'mature', a blasphemous term for a band of self-professed oddballs who had a reputation as crass and scatological pranksters [...] All the humor on Album of the Year, right down to its title, feels a bit crestfallen and self-deprecating, as if the band had aged a decade since King for a Day." In the PopMatters review for the 2016 deluxe edition, it is noted the album "was generally maligned as a disappointing swan song for Faith No More when it came out in 1997" and that "revisiting Album of the Year today is a more forgiving experience." In 2020, Louder Sound wrote "Album of the Year is an impressively cinematic album, full of widescreen, panoramic choruses – and Patton's smooth-as-satin vocals have never sounded more handsome. If you don't already own any of this band's music, though, this is not essential listening." In the same year, the magazine named it one of the 20 best metal albums of 1997.

System of a Down drummer John Dolmayan listed it as an album that changed his life for a 2020 Louder Sound feature on ten life-changing albums. Vocalist Kyo of Dir En Grey named "Mouth to Mouth" one of his favorite songs. In a 2020 interview, Coheed and Cambria guitarist Travis Stever claimed that his band were inspired by the album and Faith No More's other 1990s releases. He said, "Claudio [Sanchez] and I would drive along through our teens and early twenties blasting Angel Dust, King for a Day, and the very underrated Album of the Year. They were a part of our youth and musical upbringing, so of course it influenced the music we created." Papa Roach recorded a cover of "Naked in Front of the Computer", with it appearing as a B-side for their 2002 single "She Loves Me Not". Despite sharing the same title, Papa Roach's song "She Loves Me Not" was not a cover of the Faith No More song from Album of the Year.

Patton criticized this era of Faith No More in late 1990s and early 2000s interviews, with comments such as "[We split] Because we were starting to make bad music. And that's when you need to pull the plug. Our next record would have been a piece of shit." Mike Bordin reflected on the album on its 25th anniversary in 2022, saying, "I did probably, deep down, expect that to be the last album, because I was contributing to it while I was on tour with Ozzy, which wasn’t a bad thing – I was grateful to be doing both. I was grateful that Bill was spending so much time in his laboratory, cooking things up. I liked the songs. I liked the performances. I liked what we were doing. I felt good about the album, and I was happy with how it came out."

Commercial
As of 2015, the album had sold 221,000 copies in the US. This nearly matched the total for King for a Day... Fool for a Lifetime but was a significantly lower figure than that of the other two albums featuring Mike Patton on vocals. On other charts, it fared much better. In Australia, it topped the ARIA charts on June 28, 1997, before being overtaken by Savage Garden's self-titled album on July 4, 1997. It went Platinum in the country for sales of more than 70,000 copies. It also topped the albums chart in New Zealand. The album only had slight impact in the UK charts but it did go gold for sales of more than 100,000 copies. Album of the Year has currently sold just over one million copies worldwide.

Track listing

Track 7 recorded on 21 October 1997 at the Horden Pavilion, Sydney, Australia by MTV Australia.

Track 8 recorded on 27 August 1997 at Night Town, Rotterdam, Netherlands.

Personnel
Faith No More
 Mike Bordin – drums
 Roddy Bottum – keyboards
 Billy Gould – bass guitar, producer
 Jon Hudson – guitar
 Mike Patton – vocals

Production
 Roli Mosimann – producer, mixing
 Paul Ceppaglia – mixing assistant
 Atom – engineer
 Mike Bogus – engineer
 Daniel Presley – engineer
 Howie Weinberg – mastering
 Katherine Delaney – art direction, design

Charts

Weekly charts

Year-end charts

Certifications

Release history

Initial pressings of the Australian, UK, German and Dutch versions of the album included a bonus remix disc.

It was reissued on CD across Europe in 1999, and then again in 2003 by Warner Bros. Records.

Album of the Year would be the second album in the band's discography to be re-released by Dutch music label Music On Vinyl after Angel Dust. Released on August 26, 2013, the album had a limited pressing run of 2000 hand numbered copies on gold vinyl, as well as on black vinyl which remains available in some retailers.

Album of the Year was released as a deluxe edition on 2016 with two discs; the second disc contains eight bonus tracks.

References

External links
 Faith No More Frequently Answered Questions

Faith No More albums
1997 albums
Albums produced by Roli Mosimann
Slash Records albums